Mustafizur Rahman Manik is a Bangladeshi film director. His works include Mon Chuyeche Mon, Tomar Preme Porechi, Eto Prem Eto Maya, and Anando Ashru (2020). He won Bangladesh National Film Award for Best Director for the film Jannat (2018).

Films 
 Dui Noyoner Alo (2005)
 Mon Chuyeche Mon (2009)
 Maa Amar Chokher Moni (2011)
 Kichu Asha Kichu Bhalobasha (2013)
 Chupi Chupi Prem (2015)
 Jannat (2018)
 Ashirbaad (2022)
 Jao Pakhi Bolo Tare (2022)
 Anando Osru (Upcoming)
 Eto Prem Eto Maya (Upcoming)
 Hahakaar (Upcoming)

References

External links
 

Year of birth missing (living people)
Living people
Bangladeshi directors
Bangladeshi film directors
Best Director National Film Award (Bangladesh) winners